Trudy Harris is a picture book author from Idaho Falls, Idaho. She  taught elementary school for 20 years,  mostly in kindergarten. Currently, she teaches children's literature at Brigham Young University - Idaho. She writes books intended both for classroom and home use.

Children's books
 100 Days of School (2000) According to WorldCat, the book is held in 752 libraries 
 Pattern Fish (2000)
 Pattern Bugs (2001)
 Up Bear, Down Bear (2001)
 Over Under in and Ouch! (2003)
 20 Hungry Piggies: A Number Book (2006)
 Jenny Found a Penny (2007)
 The Clock Struck One: A Time-telling Tale (2009)
 Wow It's A Cow! (2010)
 Tally Cat Keeps Track (2010)
 Say Something, Perico (2011)
 The Royal Treasure Measure (2012)

References

Living people
People from Richfield, Utah
Year of birth missing (living people)